This list contains the names of albums that contain a hidden track and also information on how to find them. Not all printings of an album contain the same track arrangements, so some copies of a particular album may not have the hidden track(s) listed below. Some of these tracks may be hidden in the pregap, and some hidden simply as a track following the listed tracks. The list is ordered by artist name using the surname where appropriate.

 U2
 Boy: Early vinyl pressings feature a short snippet of an early version of "Fire" after "Shadows And Tall Trees". Although it was absent from early CD copies, all 2008 remasters include the snippet again.
 Zooropa: An alarm that some DJs hear after 35 seconds of dead air appears shortly after "The Wanderer."
 The Best of 1980–1990: "October" appears a minute after "All I Want Is You". The song was originally found on their 1981 album of the same name and, despite being a hidden track, represents the album's only representation on the album.
 Songs of Innocence: An extended version of the single "Invisible" appears on the deluxe edition of the album after the song "Sleep Like a Baby Tonight (Alternate Perspective Mix by Tchad Blake)"
 U2 Live at Red Rocks: Under a Blood Red Sky: "Cry / Electric Co." appeared on the original video album as track 4, but was not included in the track listing due to legal reasons. The DVD version finally lists the song.
 Elevation 2001: Live from Boston (DVD): At the end of the credits of the making-of documentary, the Dreamchaser logo will appear along with a picture of Bono. If the picture is clicked, another screen of flashing numbers will appear. If the numbers 1, 9, 7 and 6 are typed in while on this screen, a live music video for "Elevation" will play.
 PopMart: Live from Mexico City: On the second DVD, on the menu screen, if 'enter' is pressed it will take the viewer into the documentary aisle, and then if the 'Up' button on the remote control is pressed and then 'Enter,' it will select the security camera at the top of the screen, a video entitled "All Kinds of Everything" featuring a karaoke version of the Dana song with the sights of Dublin docklands.
 Zoo TV: Live from Sydney: The second disc in the DVD version is home to two hidden tracks, one of which is the band's song "Some Days are Better than Others" from Zooropa set to footage of the band's Zoo TV Tour stage being assembled and vice versa, and another is a 75-second video of atomic-bomb warning drills. The former requires the viewer to highlight the “Extras” entry. Then the viewers must press the right arrow key on your remote followed by the down key.  The Zoo TV logo at the top of the screen will be highlighted. Pressing "Enter" will make a screen with “Abort” will appear. Entering the numbers “2711” will cause the clip to play. The latter is found after accessing the “Extras” section on the DVD and highlighting the “DVD” credits. Pressing the down key, followed by the right key on the viewer's remote, a non-access symbol shows in the centre of the screen. Pressing “Enter” will show a screen with “Abort” written on it. Entering the numbers “1993” will make the clip play.
 U2 (as Passengers), Original Soundtracks 1: A song entitled "Bottoms" was listed as track 15, on UK promo copies but the song does not actually appear. On certain copies, however, it does and there is minimal mention of this.
 UB40
 Present Arms in Dub: There is a ninth track on the album, which is 15 seconds of industrial noise.
 Labour of Love III: Following the fifteen track "Leaglize It," there is a short amount of silence followed by "Brahm's Lullaby."
 TwentyFourSeven: The first track "Rainbow Nation"'s finishing closing bars contain the saxophone solo from the band's earlier song "Tyler."
 Ultra, The Sun Shines Brighter: An uncredited track "Do You Still" appears 4min 6 seconds after the final listed track ends.
 Umphrey's McGee, Anchor Drops: Rewinding the first track, "Plunger" back a few seconds, you hear a computer voice say "I Eat" and then each letter of the word Hippie is said backwards.
 Ulver, Themes from William Blake's The Marriage of Heaven and Hell: Final track "A Song Of Liberty, Plates 25 - 27" contains hidden track "Chorus" (starts at 25:36).
 Unearth, The March: 2min 30sec after the final track "Silence Caught The Stubborn Tongue" an untitled track begins.
 United Nations, United Nations, a 1-second sound of a cash register plays after 12 minutes and 59 seconds of silence.              
 UNKLE:
 Psyence Fiction: The UK Limited Edition contains a track hidden in the pregap at the start of track 1 which contains a remix of several tracks.
 War Stories: 'Tired of Sleeping' is found after the last track
 Keith Urban, Golden Road: "One Chord Song" follows the track "You're Not My God" and about two minutes of silence.
 Urge Overkill, Saturation: "Dumb Song Take 1/Operation Kissinger" at the end of the album.
 The Used
 The Used (2002): at the 8-minute mark on track 12, "Pieces Mended," lead singer Bert McCracken is heard laughing followed by a fat stripper wishing him a happy birthday (the video of this can be seen on their first CD/DVD Maybe Memories). This is followed by the song "Choke Me."
 Lies for the Liars (2007): at 5:46 on the eleventh song, "Smother Me," the song "Quesadilla" starts, which is 31 seconds and consists of guitarist Quinn Allman saying "Quesadilla" over and over to a beat.
 Usher, Here I Stand: The hidden track, "Will Work for Love" comes after two minutes of silence following the last track on the album.
 David Usher, Morning Orbit: A 'rock' version of "Black Black Heart" is an unlisted 12th track.
 underOATH:
 Define The Great Line: A Brief Intro Can Be Found Before The Fourth Track "You're Ever So Inviting" By Rewinding It.
 Act of Depression: The hidden track titled "Spirit of a Living God" at the end of this disc, clocks at 9:08. The track consists of lead guitarist Corey Steger talking about receiving Christ and becoming a Christian and dedicating the album to the "victims of rape and suicide, child molestation, people who are broken hearted, people who just can't handle life anymore and just have to fall on their knees every night and cry." in the background is Aaron Gillespie singing softly over a soft acoustic guitar tune. Afterward is the actual song, "Spirit of a Living God,"sung by Corey Steger.
 Unwritten Law, Unwritten Law: Although 418 is listed it does not have an own track. It appears after Genocide (track 12). It starts at 4:18 into track 12, giving it the name 418.

See also
 List of backmasked messages
 List of albums with tracks hidden in the pregap

References 

U